This list of yttrium compounds shows compounds of yttrium. Inclusion criteria: those that have applications, academic significance, single crystal structures or have their own Wikipedia articles.

References

Yttrium compounds
Yttrium compounds